A Sumerogram is the use of a Sumerian cuneiform character or group of characters as an ideogram or logogram rather than a syllabogram in the graphic representation of a language other than Sumerian, such as Akkadian or Hittite.
Sumerograms are normally transliterated in majuscule letters, with dots separating the signs. In the same way, a written Akkadian word that is used ideographically to represent a language other than Akkadian (such as Hittite) is known as an Akkadogram.

This type of logogram characterized, to a greater or lesser extent, every adaptation of the original Mesopotamian cuneiform system to a language other than Sumerian. The frequency and intensity of their use varied depending on period, style, and genre.

The name of the cuneiform sign written in majuscule letters is a modern Assyriological convention. Most signs have a number of possible Sumerian sound values. The readers of Assyrian or Hittite texts using these Sumerograms would not necessarily have been aware of the Sumerian language, the Sumerograms functioning as ideograms or logogram to be substituted in pronunciation by the intended word in the text's language.

For example, the Babylonian name Marduk is written in Sumerograms, as dAMAR.UTU.

In the Amarna letters, "Lady of the Lions" is the name of a Babylonian Queen mother, spelled as NIN.UR.MAH.MEŠ. While the meaning "lady (NIN) of the lions (UR.MAH.MEŠ)" is evident, the intended pronunciation is Assyrian and must be conjectured from external evidence.

See also

Hittite cuneiform
Akkadian language
Determinative
Kanji

 
Sumerian words and phrases